The Qatar Masters Open is an open chess tournament organized by the Qatar Chess Association in Doha, Qatar. Its first edition took place from 25 November to 5 December 2014.

Qatar Masters 2014
The tournament was open to every player with Elo 2300 or above.
The prize fund equaled over $100,000, with $25,000 for the winner.
There were also prizes for the best female and Arabic players, US$5,000 and US$3,500 for the first place in each category, respectively.

Yu Yangyi, a 20-year-old Chinese chess prodigy, became the Qatar Masters Champion, scoring 7.5/9; Anish Giri finished second and Vladimir Kramnik third, both scoring 7/9.
{| class="wikitable" style="text-align:center;"
! Place !! Prize
|-
| 1st || $25,000
|-
| 2nd || $15,000
|-
| 3rd || $10,000
|-
| 4th || $7,000
|-
| 5th || $6,000
|-
| 6th || $5,000
|}

Qatar Masters 2015

This was the second edition of the Qatar Masters Open, played from December 20 to December 29, 2015. The time control for each of the tournament games was 90 minutes for the first 40 moves plus 30 minutes for the rest of the game with an increment of 30 seconds per move starting from move one. Tiebreak playoffs consisted of a 2-game blitz match with time control of 5 minutes with 3 seconds increment per move starting from the move 1.

Magnus Carlsen was the winner of the tournament, scoring +5 (7 points out of 9) and defeating Yu Yangyi in the tiebreak. There was a 5-way tie for third place, amongst Vladimir Kramnik, Sergey Karjakin, Sanan Sjugirov, Ni Hua, and Vassily Ivanchuk. Finally, Vladimir Kramnik finished third.
The Prizes for the 10 best players of the tournament were as follows:

{| class="wikitable" style="text-align:center;"
! Place !! Prize
|-
| 1st || $27,000.00
|-
| 2nd || $16,000.00
|-
| 3rd || $12,000.00
|-
| 4th || $8,500.00
|-
| 5th || $7,500.00
|-
| 6th || $5,500.00
|-
| 7th || $4,500.00
|-
| 8th || $3,500.00
|-
| 9th || $2,500.00
|-
| 10th || $2,000.00
|}

There were additional prizes for the best female players (ranging from $500.00 to $8000.00), best Arabic players (ranging from $1000.00 to $2500.00), top two Junior players, and special prizes in different rating groups.

External links
 Tournament's official website

Notes

2014 in chess
2014 in Qatari sport
Chess in Qatar
Chess competitions
2014 establishments in Qatar